Kaja Rogulj (born 15 June 1986) is a Croatian retired football player who played as a defender.

Club career 
Rogulj started his football career at the NK BŠK Zmaj Blato on the island of Korčula, before moving to the HNK Hajduk Split, where he spent most of his formative years in a generation that featured, among others, Drago Gabrić and Tomislav Bušić. In 2003, however, he moved on to the NK Omiš U-19 team, where he spent the following two years.

He played his first senior team matches, however, in Bosnia and Herzegovina, at NK Posušje where he moved in 2005, and where he spent, apart from a half-season stint at HNK Segesta the following three years.

In 2008, he moved back to Croatia, to NK Slaven Belupo, featuring soon in a 2-1 aggregate UEFA Cup second qualifying round upset against Aris Thessaloniki FC before being eliminated by CSKA Moscow. On 3 March 2009, in a match against Dinamo Zagreb Kaja received an instant red card after a particularly nasty tackle on Mario Mandžukić. Later on, he was suspended for two games and had to pay a fine of around €700. He remained a first team regular until the end of his stint at Slaven, and featured in the 2009–10 UEFA Europa League qualifiers, until his team was eliminated by Tromsø IL.

In the summer of 2011, he moved to Austria Wien, signing a 2+1 year contract, with director Thomas Parits praising his jumping, timing and tackling. After a rocky first season, he established himself as a first-team player in the 2012/13 season, winning the 2012–13 Austrian Football Bundesliga with his club, and making his debut in the UEFA Champions League in 2013. After eliminating GNK Dinamo Zagreb with 4-3 on aggregate, Rogulj played in all group matches against Zenit Staint Petersburg, Atlético Madrid and FC Porto but one.

In the summer of 2014, he moved on to the Swiss team FC Luzern.

In 30 October 2017, he became a member of FK Žalgiris in Lithuania.

Rogulj retired at the end of the 2018–19 season.

References

External links
 

1986 births
Living people
Footballers from Split, Croatia
Association football central defenders
Croatian footballers
HŠK Posušje players
HNK Segesta players
NK Slaven Belupo players
FK Austria Wien players
FC Luzern players
FC Le Mont players
FK Žalgiris players
NK Dugopolje players
SV Horn players
Croatian Football League players
Austrian Football Bundesliga players
Austrian Regionalliga players
Swiss Super League players
Swiss Challenge League players
A Lyga players
First Football League (Croatia) players
2. Liga (Austria) players
Croatian expatriate footballers
Expatriate footballers in Austria
Croatian expatriate sportspeople in Austria
Expatriate footballers in Switzerland
Croatian expatriate sportspeople in Switzerland
Expatriate footballers in Lithuania
Croatian expatriate sportspeople in Lithuania